The 1998–99 season was the 112th season of competitive football by Celtic. Celtic competed in the Scottish Premier League, UEFA Cup, Scottish League Cup and the Scottish Cup.

As defending league champions, they were now managed by Slovak coach Jozef Venglos following the resignation of Wim Jansen. However, they finished runners-up behind Rangers this season and also lost to them in the Scottish Cup final.

Summary
Season 1998–99 saw Celtic finish second in the league six points behind winner Rangers. They reached the final of the Scottish Cup losing to Rangers, the third round of the League Cup losing to Airdrieonians, the second qualifying round of the Champions League and the second round of the Uefa Cup losing to FC Zürich.

Results and fixtures

Friendlies

Premier League

Champions League

UEFA Cup

League Cup

Scottish Cup

Squad

Statistics

League table

See also
List of Celtic F.C. seasons

References

Celtic F.C. seasons
Celtic